IMC Financial Markets, sometimes referred to as IMC Trading, is a proprietary trading firm and market maker for various financial instruments listed on exchanges throughout the world. Founded in 1989 as International Market makers Combination, the company employs over 1100 people and has offices in Amsterdam, Chicago, Sydney, Hong Kong, Mumbai and other places.

Trading
IMC is a technology-driven trading firm active in over 100 trading venues throughout the world and offering liquidity to over 200,000 securities.  IMC makes markets in the major exchange-traded instruments – equities, bonds, commodities, and currencies – on 100 exchanges worldwide and is a significant liquidity provider on the NYSE Arca, NASDAQ, CBOE, BATS, and CME exchanges.

References

External links
IMC (company website)

Companies based in Amsterdam
Financial services companies of the Netherlands
Financial services companies established in 1989
Privately held companies of the United States